Federico Rizzi (born 6 January 1981 in Cremona) is an Italian footballer. He plays for U.S. Salernitana 1919.

Career
Rizzi started his career at Pizzighettone in Province of Cremona. He played from Serie D and followed to club to reach Serie C1 in summer 2005.

In summer 2006, he was signed by Mantova of Serie B. After just made 5 appearances in 2007–08 season, he joined league rival Triestina on loan in mid-season.

External links
 gazzetta.it
http://aic.football.it/scheda/13412/rizzi-federico.htm

1981 births
Living people
Italian footballers
A.S. Pizzighettone players
Mantova 1911 players
U.S. Triestina Calcio 1918 players
Taranto F.C. 1927 players
U.S. Cremonese players
Trapani Calcio players
Serie B players
Association football defenders
Sportspeople from Cremona
Association football midfielders
Footballers from Lombardy